Maka Village is believed to be one of the oldest villages in the Shikarpur District of Sindh, Pakistan.
It is located near the city of Lakhi.

Populated places in Shikarpur District